The 2022–23 Houston Christian Huskies men's basketball team represented Houston Christian University in the 2022–23 NCAA Division I men's basketball season. The Huskies, led by 32nd-year head coach Ron Cottrell, played their home games at Sharp Gymnasium in Houston, Texas as members of the Southland Conference.

Previous season
The Huskies finished the 2021–22 season 11–18, 6–8 in Southland play to finish in fifth place. As the tournamen's fifth see, they defeated eighth seeded Incarnate Word in the first round of the Southland tournament, before falling to tournament champion Texas A&M–Corpus Christi in the second round.

Preseason polls

Southland Conference Poll
The Southland Conference released its preseason poll on October 25, 2022. Receiving 1 first place vote and 55 votes overall, the Huskies were picked to finish eighth in the conference.

Preseason All Conference
Darius Lee, who was killed in a mass shooting in Harlem, the New York City neighborhood where he grew up, during the offseason after having led the Huskies in scoring and rebounding in 2021–22, was posthumously selected Preseason Player of the Year.

Roster

Schedule and results

|-
!colspan=12 style=| Non-conference Regular season

|-
!colspan=12 style=| Southland Conference season

|-
!colspan=12 style=| Southland Tournament

Source

See also
2022–23 Houston Christian Huskies women's basketball team

References

Houston Christian Huskies men's basketball seasons
Houston Christian Huskies
Houston Christian Huskies men's basketball
Houston Christian Huskies men's basketball